Armin Rohde (born 4 April 1955) is a German actor and voice actor.

He was born in Gladbeck.

Filmography

Audiobooks 
 1999: Roger Graf: Philip Maloney – Auf der Flucht, Die Armbanduhr and Der Mörderhai, publisher: Tandem Verlag, 
 2006: Roger Graf: Philip Maloney – Die Leiche im Moor – 
 2007: Barbara Kindermann: Götz von Berlichingen – 
 2008: Michael Chabon: Die Vereinigung jiddischer Polizisten – 
 2012: Otfried Preußler: Die Räuber-Hotzenplotz-Edition – 
 2017: G. F. Unger: Verlorene Stadt, publisher: Lübbe Audio – 
 2017: G. F. Unger: Jamie und Clyde, publisher: Lübbe Audio – 
 2017: G. F. Unger: Texas-Marshal, publisher: Lübbe Audio – 
 2017: G. F. Unger: Flucht durch den Blizzard, publisher: Lübbe Audio – 
 2017: G. F. Unger: Pferdejäger, publisher: Lübbe Audio – 
 2017: G. F. Unger: Die Gun-Sisters, publisher: Lübbe Audio –

Publications 
 Armin Rohde: Größenwahn und Lampenfieber. Die Wahrheit über Schauspieler. (Autobiography) Publisher: rowohlt, Reinbek 2009,

References 
 Tobias Haucke and Timo Rieg (Hrsg.): Bochumer Bekannte 2. biblioviel Verlag, Bochum 2003. . (Andrea Donat, Armin Rohde und 9 weitere Bochumer im Porträt.)
 Armin Rohde: Größenwahn und Lampenfieber - Die Wahrheit über Schauspieler. Rowohlt, Reinbek bei Hamburg 2009. 
 Armin Rohde – Das Geheimnis meiner Familie. Documentary, Germany 2008

External links

 
Armin Rohde at the German Dubbing Card Index

1955 births
German male film actors
German male television actors
20th-century German male actors
21st-century German male actors
Living people
People from Gladbeck